"One of Them" is the 39th episode of Lost and the 14th episode of the second season. The episode was directed by Stephen Williams, and written by Damon Lindelof and Carlton Cuse. It first aired on February 15, 2006, on ABC. The character of Sayid Jarrah (Naveen Andrews) is featured in the episode's flashbacks. In the episode, the survivors meet and interrogate Henry Gale (Michael Emerson), a man whom they believe to be an "Other".

Plot

Flashback
In a flashback, the 1991 Allied invasion of Iraq is under way. Sayid, an Iraqi soldier, is seen burning documents with fellow soldiers. Some are resisting, and as Sayid's commander orders them to continue, American troops burst in. Sayid tries to lie, saying that their commanding officer, Tariq, has abandoned them, but the American soldier, Sam Austen (Lindsey Ginter) (who is also Kate's step-father) doesn't believe him.

Sayid is held captive by the Americans, who have found Tariq. Two higher-ranked military men ask Sayid to act as a translator, and Sayid attempts to get his CO to reveal the location of a captive American pilot. Speaking in their own language, which the Americans cannot understand, Sayid's CO orders him to grab the American's gun and kill as many as he can, but Sayid refuses. Austen knows they can't get the information and call in the next man; an American DIA agent named Kelvin Inman (Clancy Brown) orders Sayid to torture the Iraqi officer; at first, Sayid refuses this too, but agrees after the agent shows him a video of Sayid's family being gassed on the officer's orders. But while interrogating the officer, Sayid learns that it's too late, and that the pilot had been executed anyway. Sayid is eventually released by the Americans, who are pulling out. 

In the truck, Austen asks Sayid if he has a wife  or kids, to which he shakes his head. Austen asked him looks down at a photo which shows a young-looking Kate. Inman tells him that the day will come when Sayid needs information from someone — and that he will have the means to get it. He appears to speak fluent Arabic, much to Sayid's shock. However, Sayid vows never to torture again. Just before he leaves, Inman gives him several hundred American dollars for a "bus ride back to Ramadi".

On the island
On the island, Ana Lucia Cortez (Michelle Rodriguez) takes Sayid into the jungle, and he tells her to go back after seeing Danielle Rousseau (Mira Furlan), who tells him she was looking for him. Danielle asks Sayid to follow her, but he doesn't trust her, since the last time they met she set up a diversion and stole Claire's baby. She gives him her gun as a symbol of trust.

Danielle takes Sayid to a man she captured, who is in a net hanging from a tree. Danielle tells Sayid not to let him go, because she thinks he is "one of them". The man identifies himself as Henry Gale from Minnesota. Ignoring Danielle's warning, Sayid frees the man, who attempts to flee until Danielle shoots him in the back with a crossbow. When Sayid points out she almost killed him, she replies that if she wanted to kill him, she would have done so already.

Sayid brings Henry Gale to the hatch and tells John Locke (Terry O'Quinn) that he needs to talk to Henry. Henry claims he and his wife were in a hot air balloon that crashed on the island about four months ago. Jack Shephard (Matthew Fox) interrupts and notices Henry's injury. Sayid explains that it wasn't treated because they want to learn as much as they can about the man while he is still wounded. Jack intervenes and removes the arrow but Sayid tells Jack not to untie Henry. Sayid asks Locke to change the combination in the armory, so he can find out more by torturing Henry in a secure room. Sayid tells Jack to put him in the armory so no one else will see him. There, Sayid enters with Henry, and closes the door behind him.

Sayid interrogates Henry, who says that he and his wife, Jennifer, were in a hot air balloon crossing the Pacific Ocean when they crashed four or more months ago on the north shore. He said he was rich because he owned a company that mined for non-metallic minerals. Sayid picks up on this and questions his use of the past tense. Henry admits he's taken to thinking of his life in the outside world as something in the past. He continues, saying he met his wife at the University of Minnesota. After they crashed on the island, Henry claims that his wife got sick three weeks earlier, starting with a fever, degrading to delirium and ultimately resulting in her death. He describes his hot air balloon and says he dug his wife's grave near where they crashed. Sayid then moves forward and grabs one of Henry's fingers, holding it with the pliers. He then starts questioning more ferociously, threatening to break Henry's finger.

Meanwhile, James "Sawyer" Ford (Josh Holloway) is unable to sleep due to a chirping noise coming from the jungle. He asks Jin Kwon (Daniel Dae Kim) to help him find the source of the noise, but Jin ignores him, so Sawyer goes into the jungle on his own, and while searching, discovers Hugo "Hurley" Reyes (Jorge Garcia) eating from a hidden stash of food from the hatch. Hurley tells Sawyer that the noise is coming from a tree frog. Sawyer blackmails Hurley, saying he won't tell anyone else that Hurley has a secret stash of food, if Hurley helps him track the tree frog. As they search though, Sawyer makes rude remarks about Hurley's weight, and Hurley decides to go back and leave Sawyer alone to search for the frog, saying that though he (Hurley) stole food, people still like him, unlike Sawyer. Sawyer then apologizes and convinces Hurley to carry on. Sawyer and Hurley find the frog. Hurley offers to release it two beaches away, but Sawyer suddenly kills the frog by crushing it in his hand.

In response to Sayid's questioning, Henry is unable to recount the specific details of burying his wife. Sayid believes he is lying about his identity, stating he would know every last detail about digging his wife's grave. Henry then realizes that Sayid had lost someone close to him on the island. Sayid beats Henry as Jack and Locke listen from outside. Jack takes action by holding Locke, preventing him from entering the numbers at the appointed time, telling him he will only let Locke go if he opens the door. The timer goes below a minute and Locke complies by unlocking the armory and then dashing for the computer. By the time he unlocks the door, there were only ten seconds. He begins typing the code. However, in his haste he mistypes and has to correct it. As the timer passes zero, the black and white numbers flip over to red symbols. Two are Egyptian hieroglyphs, two are unknown characters and the second square from the left doesn't stop turning before the camera cuts back to Locke. The Symbols are accompanied with the loud sound of a machine "spooling up" like a jet engine turbine. Locke finally hits the 'Execute' button, at which point the timer resets to 108 and the sound dies down. Meanwhile, in the armory, Jack bursts in and stops an enraged Sayid, who yells, "He's lying!" several times. They lock a bloodied Henry back in the armory. Henry has a sinister, "knowing" look in his eyes. Jack recalls to Sayid how Danielle tortured him because she thought Sayid was an "other". Locke arrives, and agrees with Jack, stating, "To Rousseau, we're all 'others'."

Sayid is then back on the beach talking to Charlie about what happened in the hatch. Sayid thinks Henry is an "Other" because he feels no guilt about torturing him. He states that Jack and Locke will never understand that feeling, because they have forgotten what the Others have done to them. He asks Charlie if he remembers how the Others hanged him from the tree and kidnapped Claire. He says that the Others are merciless. Then he simply asks Charlie if he's forgotten what the Others have done to him.

Production
In 2001, American actor Michael Emerson won an Emmy award for his guest appearance as serial killer William Hinks on The Practice. The Lost producers liked his work on The Practice, so they were keen to cast Emerson in the role of "Henry Gale", as they thought he would fit the character well.<ref name=DVD>Audio commentary for "The Man Behind the Curtain, Season 3 DVD set of Lost</ref> Emerson was originally contracted to appear in just three episodes of Lost'', making his first appearance midway through the second season, in this episode. The producers later contracted him for another five episodes, and he would later be made a part of the main cast in the third season.

Reception
18.20 million viewers watched this episode.

References

External links

"One of Them" at ABC

Lost (season 2) episodes
2006 American television episodes
Television episodes written by Damon Lindelof